Dublinbikes (styled "dublinbikes") is a public bicycle rental scheme which has operated in the city of Dublin since 2009. At its launch, the scheme, which is sponsored by JCDecaux, used 450 French-made unisex bicycles with 40 stations. By 2011, this had expanded to 550 bicycles and 44 stations, and in 2013 it was announced that a major expansion of the scheme would add a further 950 bikes and another 58 hire points. Dublin was the 17th city to implement such a scheme, and it was considered one of the most successful bike-sharing schemes in the world; however, in recent times, progress has stalled, with only 2 of 14 phases being rolled out. , the scheme loses €376,000 a year, leading to further expansion of Dublin Bikes being put on hold.

History

The scheme was announced by Dubin City Council in 2006 when JCDecaux received 72 free advertising spaces around Dublin in a 15-year deal in return for the advertising company's funding of the project. Critics argued that the deal was an expensive one when compared to Copenhagen where companies pay to have their logos attached to the bicycle. 450 bicycle stands were installed in groups of ten and twenty in forty locations around Dublin from June 2009. The scheme was opposed by An Taisce who said it was "misuse of legislation by a local authority to facilitate a private development".

The Dublinbikes scheme was launched on 13 September 2009, with around 150 ordinary cyclists embarking on their first ride behind John Tierney, Dublin City Manager, and Andrew Montague, a councillor who was representing the Lord Mayor of Dublin on the journey.

It was announced on 18 June 2014 that Coca-Cola Zero would become a commercial partner with Dublinbikes for three years.  Starting at the end of June 2014, the brand was renamed Coca-Cola Zero Dublinbikes and the Coca-Cola Zero brand was added to each individual bike in return for investment in the scheme.

On 20 July 2017, Just Eat took over as the commercial partner for the next three years.  Just Eat invested €2.25 million in the scheme over the three-year period.  This is a 15% increase on the Coca-Cola Zero investment in order to help the profitability and expansion of the service. The brand was therefore renamed Just Eat dublinbikes and all 1,500 bikes had the new branding applied to them by August 2017. As part of the announcement, it was confirmed that an additional 15 stations would open in the city (predominantly around Grangegorman) and 100 bikes would be added to the network.

On 9 December 2020, Dublin City Council and JCDecaux announced that Now TV would become the next sponsor of Dublinbikes, in a deal worth €2.25 million over three years. The Now TV partnership comes with the release of a new app that will allow users to release a bike from their smartphone.

Progress
The scheme proved to be a great success, much exceeding predictions. Approximately 1,000 people used the bicycles in the first six hours, with a further thousand people having subscribed to use them. Some 11,000 people applied in the first fortnight and Dublin City Council's supply of subscriber cards was reduced to zero, with the Council having initially targeted a 5,000-person uptake in the first year. More than 25,000 people had applied to take part in the scheme by March 2010. Minister for the Environment, Heritage and Local Government John Gormley said after the launch this level of uptake indicated the new "mainstream" approach to cycling in Ireland.

In the first ten months of the scheme, it was reported that there were over 37,000 users, over 828,000 journeys, no accidents, no vandalism, and only one bike missing (which was recovered).

On 10 May 2010 (post-launch), city councillors in Dublin voted for more advertising hoardings to be used to help with payments, with more than 30,000 people having subscribed (1,500 was the predicted number of subscribers for this stage of the project). On 14 August 2010, it was announced that the scheme had reached its one millionth trip. By May 2011, two million journeys had been made and the scheme had expanded to 550 bicycles and 44 stations. In 2013 it was announced that a major expansion of the scheme would add a further 950 bikes and another 58 hire points.

Cost to users
To use the system, users need to take out a subscription, which allows the subscriber an unlimited number of rentals. Subscriptions can get a Long Term Hire Card costing €35, or a 3-day ticket costing €5.  Users also authorise Dublin Bikes to charge €150 from their credit card if the bike is not returned. The first half-hour of every journey is free, after that a service charge applies. See below for pricing structure:

After 4 hours, every extra 30 minutes costs €2. In practice, the system is virtually free at the point of use for Long Term subscribers as over 95% of journeys last less than 30 minutes.

Dublinbikes only accepts Chip and PIN (or other compatible EMV cards), and will not accept magnetic stripe cards such as those used in the United States.

Service
The robust bicycles are produced by the French bicycle company Mercier in Hungary and are repaired by JCDecaux. They are three-speed bicycles, fitted with Shimano Nexus gears which can be changed up and down using a twist/grip shifter on the right handlebar. A Shimano hub dynamo in the front wheel generates power for front and rear always-on LED lighting. The bikes are fitted with Schwalbe Marathon tyres. Other components include a locking system, an adjustable cushioned saddle, a front bicycle basket, a kick stand and a bell.

Each station is equipped with an automatic rental terminal and stands for 20 to 40 bicycles. Initially, fourteen terminals have credit card facilities enabling the user to purchase a 3-Day Ticket.

If a user arrives with a rented bicycle at a station without open spots, the terminal grants another fifteen minutes of free rental time.  The rental terminals also display information about neighbouring dublinbike stations, including location, number of available bicycles and open stands. A fleet of bicycle-transporting vehicles are used to redistribute bicycles between empty and full stations.

Future
In November 2010, a major five-year expansion plan was adopted due to the huge success of the scheme thus far. The plan will see the number of bikes increase from 450 to 5,000 and the number of bike stations increase from 40 to 300. The scheme will be extended as far north as DCU, as far south as UCD, as far east as Sandymount and as far west as Inchicore. The expansion will be funded differently than the original scheme, most likely through a mix of public and private funding.

In July 2012 it was announced that the first part of the scheme would begin before the end of the year.

Stations
When launched in 2009 there was a total of 40 bike stations and 450 bikes. There was a small expansion completed in 2011, adding 4 new stations and an extra 100 bikes. In April 2013 expansion plans were announced to expand the network to 102 stations and increasing the number of bikes from 550 to 1500. In March 2018, it was confirmed that the service would expand from 101 stations to 116 and from 1,500 bikes to 1,600.

Alternatives
In May 2018, Dublin City Council granted licenses to two operators, Urbo and BleeperBike, to run a new, stationless bike-sharing scheme, with "full interoperability between the two schemes".
In 2019, the second licence has been re-advertised after Urbo never launched their bikes in Dublin. The Irish company Moby won the second license and is expected to launch a fleet of electrically assisted bikes by 2020.

See also

 List of bicycle sharing systems

References

External links

 Official website

2009 establishments in Ireland
Community bicycle programs
Culture in Dublin (city)
Cycling in Ireland
Organisations based in Dublin (city)
Transport in Dublin (city)
Bicycle sharing in Ireland